Gopala (Bangla: গোপাল) (ruled c. 750s–770s CE) was the founder of the Pala dynasty of Bihar and Bengal regions of the Indian Subcontinent. The last morpheme of his name Pala means "protector" and was used as an ending for the names of all the Pala monarchs. Pala does not suggest or indicate any ethnic or caste considerations of the Pala dynasty. He came to power in later half of eighth century AD in Gaur/Gaud after being elected by a group of regional chieftains.

Origins 

There are no contemporary sources of information about Gopala's life: he is known only through the later literary references and genealogies in inscriptions.

The name of his father was Vapyata, and his grandfather Dayitavishnu. A eulogy on the Khalimpur copper plate of his son Gopala describes his father Vapyata as a Khanditarati or "killer of enemies", and his grandfather Dayitavishnu as Sarva-vidyavadata ("all-knowing" in the sense "highly educated"). The later texts of the Pala period, such as Ramacharita, mention the Pala rulers as the kings descended from the solar dynasty.

Election 

After the death of the Gauda king Shashanka, a century of anarchy and confusion ensued in Bengal. This situation is described by the Sanskrit phrase matsya nyaya ("fish justice" i.e. a situation in which the big fish prey on the smaller ones). It was during these times that Gopala came to power around 750 CE. 

The Sanskrit word prakriti is suggestive of "people" in general. The Tibetan Buddhist lama Taranatha (1575–1634), writing nearly 800 years later, also writes that he was democratically elected by the people of Bengal. However, his account is in form of a legend, and is considered historically unreliable. The legend mentions that after a period of anarchy, the people elected several kings in succession, all of whom were consumed by the Naga queen of an earlier king on the night following their election. Gopala, however managed to kill the queen and remained on the throne.

The historical evidence indicates that Gopala was not elected directly by his subjects, but by a group of feudal chieftains. Such elections were quite common in contemporary tribal societies of the region. The stanza in the Khalimpur copper plate is a eulogy, and uses the word prakriti figuratively.

Based on the different interpretations of the various epigraphs and historical records, the different historians estimate Gopala's reign as follows:

Reign and legacy

According to Manjusrimulakalpa, Gopala died at the age of 80, after a reign of 27 years. Not much is known  about his life or military career, but at the time of his death, Gopala had bequeathed a large kingdom to his son Dharmapala (770-810 CE). No records are available about the exact boundaries of Gopala's kingdom, but it might have included almost all of the Bengal region. His son and successor Dharmapala greatly expanded the kingdom, making it one of the most powerful empires in contemporary India.

Religion

A few sources written much after Gopala's death mention him as a Buddhist, but it is not known if this is true. Taranatha attested that Gopala was a staunch Buddhist and a major patron of Buddhism. He also stated that Gopala had built the famous Buddhist monastery at Odantapuri.

See also
List of rulers of Bengal

References

Pala kings
Year of birth unknown
Year of death unknown
Indian Buddhist monarchs